STS-101 was a Space Shuttle mission to the International Space Station (ISS) flown by Space Shuttle  Atlantis. The mission was a 10-day mission conducted between 19 May 2000 and 29 May 2000. The mission was designated 2A.2a and was a resupply mission to the International Space Station. STS-101 was delayed 3 times in April due to high winds. STS-101 traveled 4.1 million miles and completed 155 revolutions of the earth and landed on runway 15 at Kennedy Space Center. The mission was the first to fly with the "glass cockpit".

Crew

Spacewalks
  Voss and Williams  – EVA 1
 EVA 1 Start: 22 May 2000 – 01:48 UTC
 EVA 1 End: 22 May 2000 – 08:32 UTC
 Duration: 6 hours, 44 minutes

Mission highlights
The flight was originally given the designation "2A.2", serving as a logistics flight to carry cargo to the then-uncrewed space station, in between 2A.1/STS-96 and 3A/STS-92. STS-101 was originally planned to arrive after the Service Module Zvezda, but when Zvezda fell further behind, mission 2A.2 was split into 2A.2a and 2A.2b, the former arriving before Zvezda and the latter arriving after. The original plan for STS-101 was to have crewmembers perform a spacewalk to connect cables to Zvezda, but when the module slipped, so did the EVA, and the three spacewalk crewmembers Lu, Williams, and Malenchenko followed their EVA onto STS-106. Needing three additional crew for STS-101, the Expedition 2 crew of Voss, Helms, and Usachov joined the STS-101 crew for a short mission to their future home.

STS-101 delivered supplies to the International Space Station, hauled up using a Spacehab double module and an Integrated Cargo Carrier pallet.

Detailed objectives included ISS ingress/safety to take air samples, monitor carbon dioxide, deploy portable, personal fans, measure air flow, rework/modify ISS ducting, replace air filters, and replace Zarya fire extinguishers and smoke detectors. Critical replacements, repairs and spares were also done to replace four suspect batteries on Zarya, replace failed or suspect electronics for Zarya's batteries, replace Radio Telemetry System memory unit, replace port early communications antenna, replace Radio Frequency Power Distribution Box and clear Space Vision System target.

The mission also included incremental assembly/upgrades such as assembly of Strela crane, installation of additional exterior handrails, set up of center-line camera cable, installation of "Komparus" cable inserts and reseating the U.S. crane. Assembly parts, tools and equipment were also transferred to the station and equipment stowed for future missions.

The station was also resupplied with water, a docking mechanism accessory kit, film and video tape for documentation, office supplies and personal items. Crew health maintenance items were also transferred including exercise equipment, medical support supplies, formaldehyde monitor kit and a passive dosimetry system.

This mission was almost similar to the Columbia disaster. A damaged tile seam caused a breach which allowed superheated gas to enter the left wing during reentry. The gas did not penetrate deeply and the damage was repaired before the next flight. If it had penetrated deeply the Shuttle could have been destroyed during reentry.

This mission was the first mission to fly with a glass cockpit.

Wake-up calls
NASA began a tradition of playing music to astronauts during the Gemini program, which was first used to wake up a flight crew during Apollo 15.
Each track is specially chosen, often by their families, and usually has a special meaning to an individual member of the crew, or is applicable to their daily activities.

Gallery

See also

 List of human spaceflights
 List of International Space Station spacewalks
 List of Space Shuttle missions
 List of spacewalks and moonwalks 1965–1999
 Outline of space science

References

STS-101 Extravehicular Activities (21/22 May)

External links
 NASA mission summary 
 STS-101 Video Highlights 

Spacecraft launched in 2000
2000 in the United States
Space Shuttle missions
2000 in Florida
Articles containing video clips